Monier is a French name that may refer to the following notable people:

 Damien Monier (born 1982), French professional road bicycle racer
Étienne Monier (1889–1913), French anarchist
Evelyn Monier-Williams (1920–2015), English barrister
 Georges Monier (1892–1974), Belgian composer
Iszlam Monier Suliman (born 1990), Hungarian Sudanese judoka
 Jean Monier (or Mosnier) (1600–1656), French painter
 Joseph Monier (1823–1906), French gardener, one of the principal inventors of reinforced concrete
Monier Ventilation Shaft 1 in Brisbane, Australia
Monier Ventilation Shaft 2 in Brisbane, Australia
Monier Ventilation Shaft 3 in Brisbane, Australia
 Louis Monier (born 1956), founder of Internet search engine AltaVista
 Monier Monier-Williams (1819–1899), British Indologist
 Pierre Monier (or Mosnier) (1641–1703), French painter
 Raúl Monier (born 1960), Argentine chess master
 Robert Monier (1885–1944), French sailor
 Sébastien Monier (born 1984), French-Mauritian footballer
 Thomas Monier, French slalom canoer
 Virginia Monier, American stage actress and theatre manager

See also
 Monier Field, a baseball venue in Charleston, Illinois, USA
 Monier Group, a roofing company
 Monnier (disambiguation)

French-language surnames